Nikolay Padius (alternate spelling: Nikolai; born January 9, 1980, in Saint Petersburg, SFSR, Soviet Union) is a Russian former professional basketball player. At a height of 1.97 m (6 ft 5  in) tall, and a weight of 93 kg (205 pounds), he played at the shooting guard position.

Professional career
Padius played professionally with the following clubs: Spartak St. Petersburg, CSKA Moscow, Dynamo Moscow, Aris Thessaloniki, Dynamo Moscow Region, UNICS Kazan, Spartak Primorje, and Lokomotiv Kuban.

National team career
Padius was a member of the junior national teams of Russia. With Russia's junior national teams, he played at the 1998 FIBA Europe Under-18 Championship, the 1999 FIBA Under-19 World Cup, the 2000 FIBA Europe Under-20 Championship, and the 2001 World University Games.

He was also a member of the senior Russian national basketball team. With Russia's senior team, he played at the 2007 EuroBasket, where he won a gold medal.

Awards and accomplishments

Club honors
 EuroCup:
 Runner-up (1): 2005–06
 Russian League:
 Winner (1): 2002–03
 Third place (2): 2003–04, 2010–11
 Russian Cup:
 Runner-up (1): 2003
 Greek League
 Third place (1): 2005–06
 Greek Cup:
 Runner-up (1): 2005

Individual
Greek League All-Star: (2006)
Russian League All-Star: (2007)
FIBA EuroCup All-Star: (2007)

External links
EuroLeague.net Profile
FIBA Archive Profile
FIBA Europe Profile
Eurobasket.com Profile

1980 births
Living people
Aris B.C. players
BC Dynamo Moscow players
BC Spartak Primorye players
BC UNICS players
Maroussi B.C. players
PBC CSKA Moscow players
PBC Lokomotiv-Kuban players
Russian men's basketball players
Shooting guards